The Mahratta Education Fund (MEF) is a non-profit organization working for the spread of education to poor and deserving students of South Indian Marathi speaking community. 

The Fund was founded by a 21-year old lawyer E. Vinayaka Row during a meeting convened on September 15, 1912, hosted by Rao Saheb P. Ramachandra Rao and chaired by Dewan Bahadur K. Krishnaswami Rao Sahib (later Cabinet Secretary, Government of India).

References

Marathi language
Languages of Tamil Nadu
Languages of Karnataka
Non-profit organisations based in India